Claire Bonenfant (27 June 1925 – 29 September 1996) was a Canadian politician and champion of feminist rights. A Chevalier of the Ordre national du Québec, Bonenfant was president of the Quebec Status of Women Council. The University of Laval's "Claire Bonenfant Chair in Women's Studies" is named in her honour.

Biography
Claire Bonenfant was born 27 June 1925 in Saint-Jean, Île d'Orléans, Quebec to Alphonse Bonenfant and Georgia Pouliot. She studied library sciences and became a bookseller. During this time, she wrote numerous articles published in a wide variety of  newspapers and magazines and in 1976 made a feminist video called De femmes en filles.

In 1978, she became the President of the Council on the Status of Women and held that position until 1984. Beginning in 1979, she launched an initiative against sexism in advertising, establishing a rating system which awarded "′Déméritas′ awards for advertisers whose messages were deemed sexist and the ′Éméritas′ awards for advertisers who were helping to break down sexist stereotypes". She worked to develop the first government policy on the status of women publishing numerous studies, which reviewed the social and economic situation of women in Quebec. During her tenure, the Council founded La Gazette des femmes (The Women's Gazette) which became both an educational paper and a feminist vehicle, giving women a voice in issues which effected their lives. In 1983, Bonenfant launched another anti-sexism program called Pareille, pas pareils, aimed at educational equality. That same year, the Council held the first forum in Canada on women and the economy, entitled Les femmes: une force économique insoupçonnée, in Montreal which had around 1,000 attendees. She participated in the hearings of Bill 89, which aimed at establishing reform of the Family Law and Civil Code, and was instrumental in creating the law for pay equity, which finally passed in 1996.

From 1984 to 1987, Bonenfant served as Commissioner of the Quebec Regulator of the Cinema and in February 1989, she revived and became president of the Quebec Book Fair, serving in that capacity for the next six years. During this period, she also coordinated the programs for equal access for the Ministry of Higher Education and Science of the Government of Québec until 1 April 1990. In 1991, she was awarded the rank of Chevalière by the Ordre National du Québec. In 1993, she received the Governor General's Award in Commemoration of the Persons Case.

Bonenfant died on 29 September 1996.

Legacy
In 1997, an award to honor the citizen or group which best embodied democratic principals was established in her honour, as was the "Claire Bonenfant Chair in Women's Studies" at the University of Laval. The distinguished citizen award was last awarded in 2005. A street in Québec City also bears her name.

Selected works

References

External links
 WorldCat publications

1925 births
1996 deaths
Canadian feminist writers
Knights of the National Order of Quebec
Canadian women's rights activists
20th-century Canadian women writers
20th-century Canadian non-fiction writers
Canadian women non-fiction writers
Governor General's Award in Commemoration of the Persons Case winners